Hipeponymous is a limited-edition boxed set by Canadian rock band The Tragically Hip. It was released on November 1, 2005. The album has been certified Platinum in Canada.

Hipeponymous contains a two-CD compilation of remastered songs voted for by fans titled Yer Favourites, a full-length concert DVD recorded on November 26, 2004, at the Air Canada Centre titled That Night in Toronto, and a DVD of bonus features that includes all of the band's music videos, a backstage documentary titled Macroscopic, and a short film titled The Right Whale, which features eleven visual vignettes set to new original scores written by the band, packaged in a forty-eight page hardbound book depicting various Hip memorabilia.

A very limited number of copies dispatched from Maple Music in Canada included a special postcard signed by all five members of the band.

Contents

Yer Favourites

Disc 1
 "No Threat" (new song)
 "Grace, Too"
 "My Music at Work"
 "38 Years Old"
 "Gift Shop"
 "Ahead by a Century"
 "Vaccination Scar"
 "Three Pistols"
 "So Hard Done By"
 "Fiddler's Green"
 "Looking for a Place to Happen"
 "Cordelia"
 "'It's a Good Life if You Don't Weaken'"
 "Blow at High Dough"
 "Wheat Kings"
 "Fifty Mission Cap"
 "New Orleans Is Sinking"
 "Escape Is at Hand for the Travellin' Man"

Disc 2
 "Fully Completely"
 "Twist My Arm"
 "Courage (for Hugh MacLennan)"
 "Lake Fever"
 "Poets"
 "Fireworks"
 "Boots or Hearts"
 "Bobcaygeon"
 "Nautical Disaster"
 "Highway Girl"
 "Gus: The Polar Bear from Central Park"
 "Scared"
 "Something On"
 "At the Hundredth Meridian"
 "Long Time Running"
 "Darkest One"
 "Locked in the Trunk of a Car"
 "Little Bones"
 "The New Maybe" (new song)

That Night in Toronto
Recorded on November 26, 2004, at the Air Canada Centre in Toronto.

 "Vaccination Scar"
 "Fully Completely"
 "Grace, Too"
 "Summer's Killing Us"
 "Ahead by a Century"
 "Silver Jet"
 "As Makeshift as We Are"
 "Courage (for Hugh MacLennan)"
 "Bobcaygeon"
 "Nautical Disaster"
 "Gus: The Polar Bear from Central Park"
 "Poets"
 "At the Hundredth Meridian"
 "It Can't Be Nashville Every Night"
 "My Music at Work"
 "New Orleans Is Sinking"

First encore:
 "Heaven Is a Better Place Today"
 "'It's a Good Life if You Don't Weaken'"
 "Little Bones"

Second encore:
 "Gift Shop"
 "Springtime in Vienna"
 "Three Pistols"

Third encore:
 "Boots or Hearts"
 "Blow at High Dough"

Bonus features

Video Kills
 "Last American Exit"
 "Small Town Bringdown"
 "New Orleans Is Sinking"
 "Blow at High Dough"
 "Little Bones"
 "Locked in the Trunk of a Car"
 "Courage" (For Hugh MacLennan)
 "At the Hundredth Meridian"
 "Nautical Disaster"
 "Thugs"
 "Greasy Jungle"
 "Grace, Too"
 "Ahead by a Century"
 "Gift Shop"
 "Bobcaygeon"
 "Something On"
 "Poets"
 "My Music at Work"
 "'It's a Good Life if You Don't Weaken'"
 "Silver Jet"
 "The Darkest One"
 "Vaccination Scar"
 "It Can't Be Nashville Every Night"

Macroscopic
A short film by Christopher Mills

The Right Whale
 "Cooking in Wartime"
 "Piano Spider"
 "speakersong"
 "Air Plane"
 "Sub Way"
 "Edible Paper"
 "What's Ummm Mean?"
 "Leaving the Island"
 "Land Scape Clouds"
 "Mind Fame"
 "The Right Whale"

References

External links
Hipeponymous official website
TheHip.com - The Tragically Hip official website
Canada.com review

The Tragically Hip albums
2005 compilation albums
2005 live albums
2005 video albums
Music video compilation albums
Live video albums
Universal Records video albums
Universal Records live albums
Universal Records compilation albums